Eriocoelum is a genus of flowering plants belonging to the family Sapindaceae.

Its native range is Tropical Africa.

Species:

Eriocoelum dzangensis 
Eriocoelum kerstingii 
Eriocoelum lawtonii 
Eriocoelum macrocarpum 
Eriocoelum microspermum 
Eriocoelum oblongum 
Eriocoelum paniculatum 
Eriocoelum petiolare 
Eriocoelum pungens 
Eriocoelum racemosum 
Eriocoelum rivulare

References

Sapindaceae
Sapindaceae genera